Walther Wever (16 January 1923 – 10 April 1945) was a Luftwaffe flying ace during the Second World War. The son of former Chief of the Luftwaffe General Walther Wever, Wever served during 1943 on the Eastern Front and from 19 June 1943 until 10 April 1945 he claimed 44 aerial victories in 250 combat missions. He was also a recipient of the Knight's Cross of the Iron Cross.

Career
Wever was born on 16 January 1923 in Munich in the Weimar Republic, the son of General der Flieger Walther Wever. Following flight training in mid-1943 he was posted to 3. Staffel (3rd squadron) of Jagdgeschwader 51 (JG 51—51st Fighter Wing). At the time, 3. Depending on source, the aircraft shot down was either a Yakovlev Yak-4 light bomber, an Yakovlev Yak-4 fighter, or a Douglas A-20 Havoc bomber.

Notable landmarks during his career included his 10th kill on 1 September 1943 followed four days later by shooting down three Il-2 Sturmoviks in five minutes. On 29 March 1944 he claimed a further five aerial victories, making him an "ace-in-a-day". Then on 24 June, he claimed his 40th aerial victory.

Squadron leader
On 7 May 1944, Weaver was appointed Staffelkapitän (squadron leader) of 3. Staffel of JG 51, succeeding Lange who was transferred. Wever had already briefly led the Staffel from 15 to 30 August 1943 when Lange had been temporarily tasked with the leadership of I. Gruppe of JG 51. On 21 June, bombers of the Eighth Air Force on a shuttle bombing mission of Operation Frantic, attacked oil refineries south of Berlin before heading for the Poltava Air Base. The bombers were intercepted by elements of JG 51 led by Major Fritz Losigkeit. In this encounter, two of the escorting North American P-51 Mustang fighters were shot down, including one by Wever. One of the P-51 fighters crashed near the Luftwaffe airfield at Babruysk where III. Gruppe of JG 51 was based. In its cockpit, a map of the Poltava Air Base was found. The Gruppenkommandeur (group commander) of III. Gruppe, Hauptmann Diethelm von Eichel-Streiber, sent the map to the headquarters of Luftflotte 6 (6th Air Fleet). This intelligence led to an attack by Luftwaffe bombers which destroyed 44 parked Boeing B-17 Flying Fortress bombers and damaged further 26. On 10 July, Wever was shot down and wounded in his Messerschmitt Bf 109 G-6 (Werknummer 410413—factory number) by Soviet Anti-aircraft artillery. Command of 3. Staffel was then passed to Oberleutnant Günther Josten.

Although he lost a foot, Wever continued to fly and was awarded the Knight's Cross of the Iron Cross on 28 January 1945 for reaching the final total of 44 victories. He was then transferred to Jagdgeschwader 7 (JG 7—7th Fighter Wing), the first jet fighter wing, where he received further training on the Messerschmitt Me 262 jet fighter. On 10 April 1945, having not scored another kill, Wever was shot down and killed in action by Allied fighters near Neuruppin. That day, the Luftwaffe lost a number of Me 262 pilots, including Hauptmann Franz Schall. The Americans dubbed this day the "great jet massacre".

Summary of career

Aerial victory claims
According to Obermaier, Wever was credited with 44 aerial victories all but one claimed on the Eastern Front in 250 combat missions. Matthews and Foreman, authors of Luftwaffe Aces — Biographies and Victory Claims, researched the German Federal Archives and found records for 44 aerial victory claims with 43 claimed on the Eastern Front and one on the Western Front.

Victory claims were logged to a map-reference (PQ = Planquadrat), for example "PQ 35 Ost 43231". These sectors were then subdivided into 36 smaller units to give a location area 3 × 4 km in size.

Awards and decorations
 Iron Cross (1939) 2nd and 1st Class
 Honour Goblet of the Luftwaffe (Ehrenpokal der Luftwaffe) on 17 April 1944 as Leutnant and pilot
 German Cross in Gold on 20 March 1944 as Leutnant in the I./Jagdgeschwader 51
 Knight's Cross of the Iron Cross on 28 January 1945 as Leutnant and pilot in the 3./Jagdgeschwader 51 "Mölders"

Notes

References

Citations

Bibliography

 
 
 
 
 
 
 
 
 
 
 

German World War II flying aces
Luftwaffe pilots
Luftwaffe personnel killed in World War II
Recipients of the Gold German Cross
Recipients of the Knight's Cross of the Iron Cross
Military personnel from Munich
1923 births
1945 deaths
Aviators killed by being shot down